Marsel İlhan was the defender of championship title, however he lost to Simon Stadler in the quarterfinal.
In the final Benjamin Becker retired when the result was 6–3, 3–1 and Lu Yen-hsun became the new champion.

Seeds

  Dudi Sela (quarterfinals)
  Lu Yen-hsun (champion)
  Bobby Reynolds (first round)
  Michael Berrer (first round)
  Thiago Alves (first round)
  Benjamin Becker (final, retired)
  Nicolas Mahut (first round)
  Michail Elgin (first round)

Draw

Final four

Top half

Bottom half

References
 Main Draw
 Qualifying Draw

Israel Open - Singles
Israel Open